The 2009 Four Nations Tournament was the ninth edition of this invitational tournament, held at Guangdong Olympic Stadium, in the city of Guangzhou, China. The tournament was won by China.

Participants

Venues

Final standings

Match results

References

RSSSF

2009 in women's association football
2009
2009 in Chinese football
2009 in South Korean football
2009 in Finnish football
2008–09 in New Zealand association football
January 2009 sports events in China
2009 in Chinese women's sport
Sports competitions in Guangzhou
Football in Guangzhou